The Republic of South Africa is a country in southern Africa.

South Africa may also refer to:

Places
 South African Republic (1852–1902), or the Transvaal, known as ZAR (Zuid-Afrikaansche Republiek) in Dutch (and later Afrikaans) 
 Southern Africa, the southernmost region of the African continent
 Union of South Africa (1910–1961), the predecessor of the current Republic of South Africa

Art, entertainment and media
 "South Africa" (song), a song by Ian Gillan
"South Africa" (The Goodies), an episode of the British TV series The Goodies
"South Africa", a song by Baby Keem from The Melodic Blue, 2021

Other
 4488 Union of South Africa, a preserved British LNER Class A4 steam locomotive
 45571 South Africa, a British LMS Jubilee Class locomotive

See also
 South African (disambiguation)
 List of South Africans
 South African Texas (a bridge bidding convention)